Vol. 1 is the debut album by American doom metal band Goatsnake. It includes the former rhythm section of The Obsessed, consisting of Guy Pinhas and Greg Rogers, as well as Greg Anderson of Sunn O))) and Pete Stahl of Scream and Wool.

Track listing

Personnel
Pete Stahl – vocals, harmonica
Greg Anderson – guitar
Guy Pinhas – bass
Greg Rogers – drums
Danny Frankel – additional percussion

References

External links
Goatsnake Vol. 1 at Encyclopaedia Metallum

1999 debut albums
Man's Ruin Records albums
Rise Above Records albums
Goatsnake albums